Pimelea venosa, commonly known as Bolivia Hill rice-flower, is a flowering plant in the family Thymelaeaceae and is endemic to a restricted area of New South Wales. It is an erect shrub with densely long-hairy stems and leaves, elliptic to lance-shaped leaves and small groups of white flowers.

Description
The flowers are bisexual, white, arranged in groups of three to six with between two and six small, leaf-like bracts at the base.

Taxonomy and naming
Pimelea venosa was first formally described in 1983 by S. Threlfall in the journal Brunonia, from a specimen collected by Ernst Betche near Bolivia in 1886.

Distribution and habitat
Surveys in 1999 and after a bushfire in 2012 found no plants in known sites but after a low intensity fire in late 2019, about 200 seedlings were found.

Conservation status
This rice-flower is listed as "endangered" under the Australian Government Environment Protection and Biodiversity Conservation Act 1999. The main threats to the species include habitat disturbance, browsing by feral goats, inappropriate fire regimes and its restricted distribution.

References

venosa
Malvales of Australia
Flora of New South Wales
Plants described in 1983